Periploca is a genus of moths in the family Cosmopterigidae.

Species
Periploca arsa Hodges, 1978
Periploca atrata Hodges, 1962
Periploca cata Hodges, 1962
Periploca ceanothiella (Cosens, 1908)
Periploca darwini B. Landry, 2001
Periploca dentella Hodges, 1978
Periploca devia Hodges, 1969
Periploca dipapha Hodges, 1969
Periploca facula Hodges, 1962
Periploca fessa Hodges, 1962
Periploca funebris Hodges, 1962
Periploca gleditschiaeella (Chambers, 1876) (syn: Periploca gleditschiaeela Hodges, 1962)
Periploca gulosa Hodges, 1962
Periploca hortatrix Hodges, 1969
Periploca hostiata Hodges, 1969
Periploca intermedia Hodges, 1978
Periploca juniperi Hodges, 1978
Periploca labes Hodges, 1969
Periploca laeta Hodges, 1962
Periploca longipenis B. Landry, 2001
Periploca mimula Hodges, 1962
Periploca nigra Hodges, 1962
Periploca opinatrix Hodges, 1969
Periploca orichalcella (Clemens, 1864) (syn: Eriphia concolorella Chambers, 1875, Periploca purpuriella Braun, 1919)
Periploca otrebla H.A. Vargas, 2003
Periploca palaearcticella Sinev, 1986
Periploca repanda Hodges, 1978
Periploca serrulata Hodges, 1978
Periploca soror Hodges, 1978
Periploca teres Hodges, 1978
Periploca tridens Hodges, 1978

References
Natural History Museum Lepidoptera genus database

Chrysopeleiinae
Moth genera